Clive Richard Luke Clarke (born 14 January 1980) is an Irish former footballer. He played primarily as a left back, but also as centre back, left midfielder or centre midfielder, notably for Stoke City and twice for the Ireland international team. He is now a football agent, after leaving Sunderland for health reasons.

Career

Stoke City
Clarke started playing football with local club Newtown Schoolboys in his home town of Newtownmountkennedy (County Wicklow). He joined Stoke City as a trainee in August 1996, making his debut against Oldham Athletic in May 1999. He quickly became a regular in the team, making 55 appearances in the 1999–2000 season and 33 appearances in the 2000–01 season. In both seasons Stoke reached the play-offs where they lost to Gillingham and Walsall respectively. However he played as they won the 2000 Football League Trophy Final. Although he was dropped from the side in February 2001, which prompted him to hand in a transfer request.

However, he returned to the side in 2001–02 and helped Stoke gain promotion by beating Brentford in the 2002 Football League Second Division play-off Final. He played 32 times in 2002–03 as Stoke narrowly avoided relegation. He made 44 appearances in both the 2003–04 and 2004–05 campaigns. He left for West Ham United in the summer of 2005 after making 264 appearances for Stoke City in nine years.

West Ham United
Clarke signed for West Ham for a fee of £275,000 at the end of July 2005, brought to the club by the then manager, Alan Pardew, who wanted another left-sided player. He made only three appearances for West Ham and, in August 2006, moved to Sunderland in a deal that saw George McCartney move to Upton Park.

Sunderland
Clarke joined Sunderland as a replacement for the injured George McCartney. However, he made only four appearances before joining Coventry City on loan in October 2006 until January 2007 after which he returned to Sunderland. He made twelve appearances for Coventry but made no further appearances for Sunderland after returning from loan.

Clarke later signed a three-month loan deal with Leicester City on 16 August 2007. During the League Cup tie between Nottingham Forest and Leicester on 28 August 2007, Clarke collapsed and suffered a cardiac arrest in the changing rooms at the City Ground causing the match to be abandoned at half-time, with the score at 1–0. It was reported by the BBC that Clarke was being treated in the emergency room at the Queen's Medical Centre in Nottingham. He was said to be 'stable' and would be kept in overnight.

In an act of sportsmanship, Leicester allowed Forest to score the opening goal on the re-match to regain the advantage they had when the first game was abandoned. Leicester players stood aside to allow Forest goalkeeper Paul Smith to take in the ball from the kick-off. Reportedly even the bookmakers decided to pay out on the scorer of the first contested goal as well as paying out on both the 3–2 official result and the 3–1 "real" scoreline.

Clarke told the BBC on 2 September 2007 that he felt lucky to be alive.

Clarke told Sky Sports on 12 September 2007 that he was still hopeful of playing again, but he never made another appearance for Leicester following the incident, and he returned to Sunderland in November 2007. He left Sunderland by mutual agreement in February 2008 after medical advice.

After football
After retiring from football due to health problems, Clarke became a football agent.

International career
Clarke was a Republic of Ireland Under 21 player and has two caps for the Republic of Ireland senior team, against Nigeria in May 2004 and against Jamaica in June 2004.

Career statistics

Club
Source:

International
Source:

Honours
Stoke City
 Football League Trophy 1999-2000 : Winner

 Football League Division Two Play-Offs 2002 : Winner

References

External links
 

1980 births
Living people
Association footballers from County Dublin
Association football fullbacks
Premier League players
English Football League players
Republic of Ireland association footballers
Leicester City F.C. players
Stoke City F.C. players
West Ham United F.C. players
Sunderland A.F.C. players
Coventry City F.C. players
Republic of Ireland international footballers
Republic of Ireland under-21 international footballers